Brachiacantha tau, the t-marked larkspur lady beetle, is a species of lady beetle in the family Coccinellidae. In the Brachiacantha genus, the oval-shaped shiny beetles are usually about 2-3 mm in length. The larvae are not usually encountered because they feed on scale insects within ant colonies. Adults are sometimes found on flowers or hunting within foliage in North America.

References

Further reading

 

Coccinellidae
Articles created by Qbugbot
Beetles described in 1859